Guglielmo Marconi University (GMU), often abbreviated as UniMarconi is a private, non-profit university in Rome, Italy. The university offers degrees at the undergraduate and graduate level.

History
The university was originally proposed by the Tertium Foundation, a consortium formed by "Cassa di Risparmio di Roma", the InterUniversity consortium “Formazione per la Comunicazione”, and "Cassa di Risparmio di Bologna" in Rome, Italy. Guglielmo Marconi University was approved with a 2004 Ministerial Decree of qualifications recognized by Italian law and by the Italian education system. In 2005, the university joined the GUIDE Association - a consortium of 120 universities.

Campus

Guglielmo Marconi University has three main campuses, all located in Rome:
 Headquarters and Administrative Offices - located in Vio Plinio
 Didactic Production Center - located in Via Vittoria Colonna
 Classrooms and Lecture Halls - located in Via Paolo Emilio

The university also has more than twenty examination locations throughout Italy.

Academics 
Guglielmo Marconi University offers degrees at the undergraduate and graduate level. Academic programs are housed in six schools:
 Economy
 Law
 Letters
 Education Sciences
 Political sciences
 Engineering

Accreditation 
Guglielmo Marconi University is accredited by the Italian Ministry of Education (“Ministero dell’Istruzione, dell’Università e della Ricerca”).
ANVUR (Agenzia Nazionale di Valutazione del Sistema Universitario e della Ricerca) is the Italian National Agency for the Evaluation of the University and Research Systems. GMU Result = Ctel - SATISFACTORY

Research and projects 
The university carries out an intense research activity that involves its professors, scientific publications and journals, laboratories, PhDs, and research groups engaged in projects at national and European level with particular regard to the area of energy and the environment, as well as the sector of applications of higher education technologies.
Research activities are organized into four departments:
Department of Legal and Political Science
Department of Economic and Business Science
Department of Human Sciences
Department of Engineering sciences

Student media
GMU Magazine is a monthly publication started in 2016 to promote the university's academic and research activities. The magazine is divided into three sections: Academic Highlights, Spotlight on Research, and Glance at the Future. Each section is dedicated to key activities, international projects, events, and news the university wishes to share with international community members and partners. The main themes discussed in the magazine concern e-Learning, Mobility, Training, Academic Research, Technology, Industry 4.0, and Current News (relevant to these topics).

Athletics 
The Italian Rugby Federation and Guglielmo Marconi University have entered into an agreement for scholarships for athletes.

Notable people

Alumni 
Federica Cesarini
Antonio Virgili

Faculty 
Maria Chiara Carrozza
Rainer Masera 
Carlo Pelanda
Paolo Savona

References

External links
 Official website in Italian
 Official website in English

 
Universities and colleges in Rome
2004 establishments in Italy
Educational institutions established in 2004